The St. Lucie Village Historic District is a historic district located in St. Lucie Village, Florida. The district runs from 2505 through 3305 North Indian River Drive. Out of the 50 structures lining the Indian River Drive, 35 are of historical interest with the contributing structures ranging from Frame Vernacular to Late Victorian architecture. On December 1, 1989, the historic district was added to the National Register of Historic Places for its architectural and historical significance.

History
The residential neighborhood exists as a remnant of the surrounding communities of Fort Capron which was built in accordance with the 3rd Seminole War during the 1850s. The fort served as housing for many men throughout the third seminole war and paved the way for the establishment of St. Lucie village after the establishment of the armed occupations act.  A stone monument currently occupies the site of Fort Capron at 3015 North Indian River Drive. The east to west thoroughfare was to have been the entrance to a bridge that would span the Indian River, however while under construction the bridge was destroyed by the Hurricane of 1928. The thoroughfare was named Chamberlin Boulevard after Mrs. Hattie Chamberlin of Kansas City, Missouri who planted a row of Washingtonia palms in the street's median during the Florida land boom of the 1920s.

References

External links

 St. Lucie County listings at National Register of Historic Places
 Town of St. Lucie Village Official Web Site

National Register of Historic Places in St. Lucie County, Florida
Historic districts on the National Register of Historic Places in Florida
Vernacular architecture in Florida